The Security Council of Kyrgyzstan is a political/constitutional body in the Office of the President of the Kyrgyz Republic. Its tasks are to consider internal and external threats to Kyrgyzstan and maintaining its security and defense. Being a purely advisory body, it aides the President in developing his/her decisions related to the Armed Forces of Kyrgyzstan and other law enforcement bodies. The security council was renamed in 2010 to the defense council and was reverted to its former name in March 2017. The Secretary is the head of the council, being a member of the Administration of the President. The current Secretary of the Security Council is Marat Imankulov.

Composition of members
The when the council is convened (usually twice a year), it is composed of the following members:

President of Kyrgyzstan (Chairman)
Secretary of the Security Council
Prime Minister of Kyrgyzstan 
Head of the Presidential Office
Speaker of the Jogorku Kenesh
Chief of the General Staff
Minister of Defense
Minister of Foreign Affairs
Minister of Internal Affairs 
Minister of Emergency Situations
Prosecutor General
Chairman of the State Committee for National Security

List of Secretaries 
 Miroslav Niyazov (2005 – 2006)
 Tokon Mamytov (2007 – 2008)
Adakhan Madumarov (5 October 2008 — 26 October 2009)
Alik Orozov (2009 – 23 August 2010)
Marat Imankulov (23 August 2010 – January 2011)

 Zhenish Razakov (28 August 2017 – 26 October 2017)

 Almazbek Kurmanaliev (26 October 2017 – 18 December 2017)

 Damir Sagynbayev (12 March 2018 – 10 October 2020)
 Vacant (10 October 2020 – 27 October 2020)
 Ryskeldi Musaev (27 October 2020 – 8 May 2021)
 Marat Imankulov (8 May 2021 – present)

Notes

References

Government of Kyrgyzstan
Kyrgyzstan
Military of Kyrgyzstan
Law enforcement in Kyrgyzstan
1992 establishments in Kyrgyzstan